Argyrotome is a genus of moths in the family Geometridae.

Species
 Argyrotome mira (Oberthür, 1883)

References
 Argyrotome at Markku Savela's Lepidoptera and Some Other Life Forms

Ennominae
Geometridae genera